Steinheil Point is a point 5 nautical miles (9 km) southeast of Duthiers Point on the west side of Andvord Bay, on the west coast of Graham Land. First roughly charted by the Belgian Antarctic Expedition under Gerlache, 1897–99. Named by the United Kingdom Antarctic Place-Names Committee (UK-APC) in 1960 for Adolf Steinheil (1832–1893), German mathematical optician who designed and introduced an improved aplanatic camera lens in 1866 and, independently, the telephoto lens in 1891.

Headlands of Graham Land
Danco Coast